Alice Sophia Eve (born 6 February 1982) is a British actress. Her movie career includes roles in She's Out of My League, Men in Black 3, Star Trek Into Darkness, and Before We Go. She has had recurring roles on the TV series Entourage and Iron Fist.

Early life 
Eve was born in London, the daughter of actors Trevor Eve and Sharon Maughan. She has two younger brothers, and is of English, Irish and Welsh descent. She went to Bedales School and More House School, then took her A-levels at Westminster School in London.

During her gap year, she studied at the Beverly Hills Playhouse and then read English at St Catherine's College, Oxford. At Oxford, she appeared in student productions of The Importance of Being Earnest, Animal Crackers (which toured to the Edinburgh Festival Fringe) and Scenes from an Execution.

Career 
Eve has appeared in television dramas such as the BBC's The Rotters' Club, Agatha Christie's Poirot and Hawking and starred in the drama film Stage Beauty (2004).

In 2006, she starred in two comedy films: Starter for 10 and Big Nothing (in which she and co-star Simon Pegg put on American accents). She spent the early part of 2006 in India working on the drama miniseries Losing Gemma about backpackers.

On the stage, Eve has appeared in two plays directed by Trevor Nunn. In 2006, she played young Esme/Alice in the new Tom Stoppard play Rock 'n' Roll, at the Royal Court Theatre, later reprising her role for the 2007 Broadway transfer. For this performance, she was nominated for the best supporting actress award at the Whatsonstage.com Theatregoers' Choice Awards.

In 2009, she played Roxane in a production of Cyrano de Bergerac at the Chichester Festival Theatre.

In 2010, Eve played the female lead role in the American romantic comedy She's Out of My League, in which her parents play the roles of her character's parents. She also played the role of Erin, Charlotte's Irish nanny, in Sex and the City 2.

During 2011, Eve had a recurring guest role in season 8 of the HBO series Entourage, as Sophia, a journalist and love interest to Vincent Chase. In 2011 Eve also portrayed Hollywood actress Lara Tyler in the romantic comedy The Decoy Bride. Eve is also known for her role of Dr. Carol Marcus in Star Trek Into Darkness.

In 2012, she played the younger 1969 version of Agent O in the sci-fi comedy Men in Black 3, the older version being played by Emma Thompson.

Eve took part in the opening session of the 2013 Consumer Electronics Show. She appeared in Paul McCartney's music video "Queenie Eye" (2013), and in Rixton's music video "Hotel Ceiling" (2015).

In 2013, she co-starred in the romantic drama Before We Go with Chris Evans, who also directed the film. She played herself in the Hollywood film Night at the Museum: Secret of the Tomb (2014) and has since starred in several productions, including the action thriller Criminal (2016).

In 2016, she appeared in "Nosedive", an episode of the anthology series Black Mirror. In December 2017, Eve joined Netflix's Iron Fist as Mary Walker.

Personal life 
Eve was in a long-term relationship with poet Adam O'Riordan, whom she met while reading English at Oxford. They broke up in 2012. On 14 August 2014, Eve announced her engagement to her "high school sweetheart", financier Alex Cowper-Smith, whom she met while attending Westminster School in London. They married on 31 December 2014 and divorced in 2017.

Eve has heterochromia, a condition that causes her eyes to have irises of different colours. Her left eye is blue and her right eye is green. 

She lives in London and Los Angeles. She became a naturalised citizen of the United States on 16 November 2017.

Eve has ADHD.

Filmography

Film

Television

Music videos

References

External links 

 Alice Eve: The Official Website
 
 
 

Living people
21st-century English actresses
21st-century American actresses
Actresses from London
People educated at Bedales School
Alumni of St Catherine's College, Oxford
English film actresses
English people of Irish descent
English people of Welsh descent
English stage actresses
English television actresses
English emigrants to the United States
Naturalized citizens of the United States
American film actresses
American people of Irish descent
American people of Welsh descent
American stage actresses
American television actresses
Year of birth missing (living people)